Herpetostrongylidae is a family of nematodes belonging to the order Strongylida.

Genera

Genera:
 Amphicephaloides Beveridge, 1979
 Austrostrongylus Chandler, 1924
 Beveridgiella Humphery-Smith, 1981

References

Nematode families